Slaphappy: Pride, Prejudice, and Professional Wrestling is a book written by reporter Thomas Hackett that describes, with a sociological and philosophical bent, the industry of professional wrestling.

Reception
The New York Times gave the book a mediocre review. Kirkus Reviews said the book is a "punch-drunk saga of showbiz ugliness". Publishers Weekly called the title a "fascinating study".

References

Sources
 Hackett, Thomas. Slaphappy: Pride, Prejudice, and Professional wrestling. Harper Collins. New York, NY. 2006.

2006 non-fiction books
Professional wrestling books
HarperCollins books